Anthony Correia may refer to:
Anthony Correia (footballer, born 1982), Surinamese footballer
Anthony Correia (footballer, born 1999), French footballer